Izalat al-Khafa'an Khilafat al-Khulfa (lit. 'Removal of Ambiguity about the Caliphate of the [Early] Caliphs') is an authentic book by the Islamic scholar  Shah Waliullah Dehlawi in the Persian language.

Overview
In Izalat al-Khafa' an Khilafat al-Khulafa, Shah Wali Allah attempts to demonstrate the fundamental importance of this early model of Khiliifah, as one of the cardinal principles of religion. Explaining the purpose of writing this book in its preface, he says:

In this age, the heretic credulity of people has lent itself to the influence of the doctrines of the Shi'ah so much so that many people in this country entertain doubts regarding the validity of the installation of the Orthodox Caliphs. Therefore, Divine favor radiated the heart of this humble servant with knowledge. It established with certainty the conviction that the accession to the caliphal office (khilafah) by these early elders of Islam was one of the cardinal principles of religion. Without strict adherence to this principle, no other principle of the shari'ah could be sustained on any firm ground.

Izalat al-Khafa had generally been regarded as one of the main sources of Shah Wali Allah's political thought ever since its first publication in 1286 A.H.

Intellectual viewpoints in the book 

While Shah Waliullah's treatment of this subject in the Buzur and the Hujjah is mainly metaphysical and juridical, his discussion in Izalat al-Khafa is focused on the actualization of the sociopolitical ideals of Islam in history. From this historical analysis, Shah Wali Allah derives the applied principles of state and government. There was another significant pragmatic motive in this academic undertaking on the part of Shah Wali Allah: it addressed an intellectual issue of contemporaneous relevance for his time. As we have noted in his own remarks cited above, Shah Wali Allah felt inspired to write this book in order to dispel the doubts cast on the institution of Caliphate under the influence of the Shi'a theologians who questioned the validity of the early caliphal era as a normative model for the socio-political ideals of Islam in history. This perhaps explains why he chose to articulate his views in Persian, the lingua franca of the Muslim intelligentia of India at that time. For a number of his other works, however, he preferred Arabic, as in the case of the Buzur and the Hujjah, apparently because these works were primarily addressed to specialists in the Islamic lore all over the Muslim world whose intellectual medium of communication had always been Arabic.

Preface of Izalat al-Khafa 

Explaining the significance of his endeavor in the preface of Izalat al-Khafa, Shah Wali Allah substantiates his contention that the conviction about the valid caliphal authority of the four early caliphs was one of the cardinal principles of Religion. In this connection, he argues that a large body of injunctions contained in the Qur'an was brief and summarily expressed. Their full understanding and wider ramifications compel recourse to explanations and commentaries of the early pious authorities (salaf salih). Further, for their interpretation, we have to fall back on the traditions. These traditions cannot be admitted as an authentic record of Muhammad's exemplary pattern (sunnah) nor relied upon in juridical arguments, without
their transmission and confirmation by these early authorities. Besides, no instrument of resolving the seemingly conflicting traditions is available to us except our reliance on their verdicts. In all the above areas, the early authorities have strictly followed the acts and utterances of these Caliphs. Also the compilation of the Qur'an and a consensus on its authentic reading was accomplished by the efforts of the early caliphs and under their supervision and guidance. Moreover, detailed rules with regard to the institution of the judiciary, the penal ordinances of the shari'ah and the provisions in other fields of public law are based on their opinions and rulings. From these premises, Shah Wali Allah arrives at the -conclusion that: "Whoever attempts to break away from this root (i.e. the early khilafah), he indeed seeks to obliterate the entire corpus of the Religious Sciences."

Concepts of Khilafah Ammah & Khilafah Khassah 

After a brief preface, Shah Wali Allah divides this work into two parts. Part one discusses the conceptual foundations and legal and constitutional framework of the khilafat, with its two categories of Khilafah Ammah and Khilafah Khassah. Part one further deals with the arguments for the validity of the early caliphate model and reconciles between the two apparently conflicting views with regard to the discretionary or mandatory character of khilafat. Part one also presents a detailed explanation of the relevant injunctions of the Qur'an and the hadith on the basis of which Shah Wali Allah upholds the obligatory nature of the khilafah/Khilafat. He then defines various modes of installation of the khalifah/khilafat, his requisite qualifications, functions and duties and mutual relations between him and the people in general.

Shah Wali Allah then proceeds to discuss the main ingredients of the early normative model, i.e. khilafah khassah. This term has been adopted by Shah Wali Allah to denote the textual evidence in favour of the four immediate successors of Muhammad, as distinct from the Caliphs who came after them. He explains its mandatory character and substantiates it by citing a large number of verses and traditions that have a bearing on various aspects of the khilafah khassah. 

Then he undertakes a historical appreciation of the role of khilafah in the growth, progress and advancement of Islam's mission and the profound impact of its rich culture and universal civilization on humanity, which was realised through the agency of khilafah during the various stages of its history. 

In passing, Shah Wali Allah also surveys the rise and fall of the Muslim society during the different phases of caliphal history which, according to him, had always been commensurate with the degree of conformity or conflict between the pattern of khilafah and the criteria provided by the early normative model.

 The second part of Izalat al-Khafa 
 
This part deals with those aspects of the lives of the four early caliphs which point to the singularly excellent virtues (fada'il) that make their political conduct an exemplary pattern in statecraft. Thus this work adopts a dual approach, one that combines the juridical and historical treatment of the subject. Further, it sets out to refute the political doctrines of the Shi'ah. This is not only the central theme of the book, but also the main motive of this study. Additionally, the book has a pronounced scholastic orientation.

Again in the second part, Shah Wali Allah presents an in-depth study of the verses of the Qur'an and Muhammad's traditions that allude to the high status of the four caliphs in general and the first two among them in particular, either explicitly or implicitly. To this end, he not only interprets the relevant texts (nusus''), but also marshals additional evidence from the generally accepted principles of jurisprudence with regard to the interpretation of texts to support and substantiate his contentions. In this process, he takes notice of the many objections, real as well as hypothetical, that can be raised against these interpretations and then refutes them. He also refutes many political and theological doctrines of the Shi'ah by adducing traditional and rational arguments and controverts their assertions that belittle the status of these companions and successors of Muhammad.

Shah Wali Allah also presents, in the second part of Izalat al-Khafa', various authentic reports contained in the collections of traditions and in the annals of Islamic history. He supplements these reports with his profound analytical comments that go to prove the extraordinarily high moral, ethical and spiritual conduct of the early Caliphs like Abu Bakr, Umar, Uthman and Ali- the four great caliphs of Khulafa-e-Rashida (see Rashidun Caliphate). Further, he highlights their singular role in the reformation and guidance of the society and the expansion and promotion of the universal mission of Islam in their times. In addition to these aspects and dimensions of these personalities, Shah Wali Allah also throws light on the intellectual and academic contribution of the companions of Muhammad, particularly in the fields of the Qur'an, Hadith, law, jurisprudence, international relations, Arabic language and spiritual guidance. All these constitute, according to Shah Wali Allah, an extension of the mission undertaken by Muhammad.

Other works 

Shah Waliullah was a prolific writer and addressed a wide range of subjects related to Islamic studies. They include Tafsir, Hadith, Fiqh, Usul al-fiqh, 'Aqa'id (beliefs), Kalam (scholastics), philosophy, Tasawwuf (spiritual sciences), history, biography, Arabic poetry, and grammar.

References 

1. Abdul Malik Mujahid. Golden Stories of Umar Ibn Al-Khattab (R.A). Darussalam Publishers. pp. 307–. GGKEY:TXKYGN3YTDN
2.Al-Ghazali, Muhammad (2001), The Socio-Political Thought of Shah Wali Allah, The International Institute of Islamic Thought, Islamabad

History books about Islam
Persian-language books
18th-century Indian books
Historiography of Islam
Indian religious texts
Islamic studies books